The Philadelphia String Quartet was an American string quartet started in Philadelphia, Pennsylvania. The string quartet was started in 1959-60 by four members of the Philadelphia Orchestra, who later broke off from the orchestra and accepted residency in Washington. Alan Iglitzin, the founding violist of the quartet, later went on to found the Olympic Music Festival near Quilcene, Washington.

History
The original founding members of the Philadelphia String Quartet were Alan Iglitzin (viola), Irwin Eisenberg (second violin), Charles Brennand (cello), and Veda Reynolds (first violin). The original quartet made its New York City debut at Carnegie Hall during the 1963-64 season.

The move angered orchestra management, which sued to prevent the quartet's departure, claiming a violation of contract. In 1961, the group was appointed quartet in residence at the University of Pennsylvania. The players eventually won the right to leave the orchestra. The foursome resigned from the orchestra to become quartet-in-residence at the University of Washington in 1966.

In 1966, Alan Iglitzin and other members of the Philadelphia String Quartet moved to Seattle to become the University of Washington's Quartet-in-Residence, a position it held until 1982. During its 30-year tenure, the Quartet made numerous European and international tours and recorded much of the chamber music repertoire.

From 1976-77, the Quartet played their Beethoven cycle: this included Quartet No. 3 in D Major, Quartet No. 9 in C Major, Quartet No. 16 in F Major, and the Große Fuge.

In 1984, Mr. Iglitzin founded the Olympic Music Festival on Washington's Olympic Peninsula, originally intending it to be a summer home for the Philadelphia String Quartet. In the years since, the music festival has become popular with Northwest audiences and was voted "Best Classical Music Festival" by readers of The Seattle Weekly.

The name of the quartet has been revived by Violist Radhames Santos. A new web site has been made: Philadelphia String Quartet

References
Olympic Musical Festival Website
Spokane Daily Chronicle article

American string quartets
Musical groups established in 1960
1960 establishments in Pennsylvania